Machynlleth Football Club is a Welsh football team based in Machynlleth, Powys, Wales. They played in the Ardal Leagues North East, which is in the third tier of the Welsh football league system but withdrew from the league in July 2022 citing lack of player commitment. For the 2022–23 season they will instead play in the Central Wales Southern Division.

Honours

Mid Wales Football League Division One – Champions: 1992–93; 1993–94; 1994–95
Mid Wales Football League Division One – Runners-up: 2013–14; 2019–20

References

External links
Club official twitter

Football clubs in Wales
Mid Wales Football League clubs
Sport in Powys
1885 establishments in Wales
Association football clubs established in 1885
Ardal Leagues clubs